The 1935 Major League Baseball season was contested from April 16 to October 7, 1935. The Chicago Cubs and Detroit Tigers were the regular season champions of the National League and American League, respectively. The Tigers then defeated the Cubs in the World Series, four games to two.

Awards and honors

Most Valuable Player
Hank Greenberg, Detroit Tigers (AL)
Gabby Hartnett, Chicago Cubs (NL)

Statistical leaders

Standings

American League

National League

Postseason

Bracket

Managers

American League

National League

Home Field Attendance

Events
February 5 – Home run king Babe Ruth is released by the New York Yankees.
May 24 – At Crosley Field, the Cincinnati Reds and the visiting Philadelphia Phillies played the first night game, which Cincinnati won 2–1.
May 25 – Babe Ruth of the Boston Braves goes 4-for-4 with three home runs and six runs batted in. It is the last multi-homer game of Ruth's career, with the final home run being the first ball ever hit to clear the roof at Forbes Field in Pittsburgh.
May 30 – Babe Ruth ends his playing career with the Boston Braves of the National League.
July 8 – At Cleveland Municipal Stadium, home of the Cleveland Indians, the American League defeats the National League, 4–1, in the All-Star Game.
August 31 – Vern Kennedy pitches a no-hitter as the Chicago White Sox defeat the Cleveland Indians 5–0.
October 7 – The Detroit Tigers defeat the Chicago Cubs, 4–3, in Game 6 of the World Series to win their first World Championship, four games to two.  This was Detroit's first Series victory after failing to win four previous times.
November 26 – The National League takes over the bankrupt, last-place Boston Braves franchise after several failed attempts to buy the club. The league takes over only temporarily, until matters can be straightened out.

References

External links
1935 Major League Baseball season schedule at Baseball Reference

 
Major League Baseball seasons